Taika Gon (権 泰夏, originally Tae-ha Kwon, 권 태하, June 2, 1906 – October 10, 1971) was a Korean long-distance runner. He competed in the marathon at the 1932 Olympics and finished in ninth place. He competed for Japan under his Japanese name as Korea was part of the Japanese Empire at the time. The name is based on the Japanese kanji pronunciation of his Korean hanja name.

References

1906 births
1971 deaths
Japanese male long-distance runners
Korean male long-distance runners
Japanese male marathon runners
Korean male marathon runners
Olympic male marathon runners
Olympic athletes of Japan
Athletes (track and field) at the 1932 Summer Olympics
Japan Championships in Athletics winners
20th-century Japanese people